The 1964–65 Western Kentucky State Hilltoppers men's basketball team represented Western Kentucky State College (now known as Western Kentucky University) during the 1964-65 NCAA University Division Basketball season. The Hilltoppers were led by first year coach John Oldham and Ohio Valley Conference Player of the Year Clem Haskins.  After two losing seasons, WKSC finished second in the OVC and were invited to the 1965 National Invitation Tournament.

Haskins scored a school record 55 points against Middle Tennessee on January 30.  He was joined on the all-conference team by fellow sophomore Dwight Smith; Haskins and Steve Cunningham were selected to the OVC Tournament team.

Cultural Relevance
Haskins and Smith broke the color barrier this season at Western Kentucky, becoming the first African Americans to play Hilltopper basketball. They were recruited two years earlier by the previous, longtime coach Edgar Diddle; NCAA rules at the time prohibited freshman from playing varsity sports, so this was their first year of eligibility.

Schedule

|-
!colspan=6| Regular Season

|-

 

|-
!colspan=6| 1965 National Invitation Tournament

References

Western Kentucky Hilltoppers basketball seasons
Western Kentucky State
Western Kentucky State
Western Kentucky State Basketball, Men's
Western Kentucky State Basketball, Men's